Penny Collenette  (born May 20, 1950, in Oakville, Ontario) is a Canadian lawyer, professor and political figure of the Liberal Party of Canada.

The wife of former Liberal Member of Parliament and cabinet minister David Collenette, she sought, and won, the 2008 Liberal nomination over community activist and businessman Scott Bradley for the riding of Ottawa Centre, which was held by Paul Dewar of the New Democratic Party.  She came in second to Dewar in the election.

She was vice-chair of the human rights committee for Liberal International in 1987, and director of volunteers for Jean Chrétien’s leadership race in 1984 and campaign director in the successful 1990 bid, as well as national director and director of legal services for the Liberal Party of Canada in the 1993 election. She was subsequently named Director of Appointments for the Prime Minister's office, making hundreds of appointments over four years on the job.

In 2013, Collenette was admitted to the Order of Ontario for her work in ethics and human rights.

References

External links 
 http://www.pennycollenette.ca/

1950 births
Canadian Anglicans
Carleton University alumni
Candidates in the 2008 Canadian federal election
Living people
Members of the Order of Ontario
Ontario candidates for Member of Parliament
People from Oakville, Ontario
Spouses of Canadian politicians
Academic staff of the University of Ottawa
Women in Ontario politics
21st-century Canadian women politicians
Liberal Party of Canada candidates for the Canadian House of Commons